is a Japanese anime television series created by E&G Films. Directed by Takashi Watanabe and written by Katsumi Hasegawa, the anime's 22 episodes were broadcast on TBS between October 14, 2000, and March 17, 2001. It took over the Saturday 17:30 - 18:00 timeslot once claimed by the Sakura Wars TV series.

Plot

Video game
On March 9, 2001, Marvelous Entertainment released a Game Boy Color video game adaptation.

Anime
The anime uses two pieces of theme song. "Unsteady" is the series' opening theme while "Lost in You" is the series' ending theme. Both are sung by Megumi Hayashibara.

References

External links
 

2000 anime television series debuts
2000 Japanese television series debuts
2001 Japanese television series endings
2001 video games
Marvelous Entertainment
Anime with original screenplays
Game Boy Color games
Game Boy Color-only games
Japan-exclusive video games
Mecha anime and manga
TBS Television (Japan) original programming
Video games developed in Japan